Zheng Qinwen was the defending champion but chose to participate at the 2022 French Open instead.

Robin Anderson won the title, defeating Sachia Vickery in the final, 7–5, 6–4.

Seeds

Draw

Finals

Top half

Bottom half

References

Main Draw

Orlando USTA Pro Circuit Event 2 - Singles